Arie van Houwelingen (born 28 November 1931) is a retired cyclist from the Netherlands. In 1959 he won the UCI Motor-paced World Championships in the amateurs category and was named the Dutch Sportsman of the year. He then turned professional and finished in second place at the national championships in 1960 and 1961.

References

1931 births
Living people
Dutch male cyclists
People from Boskoop
Cyclists from South Holland
20th-century Dutch people
21st-century Dutch people